The canton of La Chapelle-de-Guinchay is an administrative division of the Saône-et-Loire department, eastern France. Its borders were modified at the French canton reorganisation which came into effect in March 2015. Its seat is in La Chapelle-de-Guinchay.

It consists of the following communes:
 
Bourgvilain
Chaintré
Chânes
La Chapelle-de-Guinchay
La Chapelle-du-Mont-de-France
Chasselas
Crêches-sur-Saône
Davayé
Dompierre-les-Ormes
Fuissé
Germolles-sur-Grosne
Leynes
Matour
Montmelard
Navour-sur-Grosne
Pierreclos
Pruzilly
Romanèche-Thorins
Saint-Amour-Bellevue
Saint-Léger-sous-la-Bussière
Saint-Pierre-le-Vieux
Saint-Point
Saint-Symphorien-d'Ancelles
Saint-Vérand
Serrières
Solutré-Pouilly
Tramayes
Trambly
Trivy
Vergisson
Verosvres
Vinzelles

References

Cantons of Saône-et-Loire